Alanson Hodges Hough (October 26, 1803 – August 18, 1886) was an American physician and politician.

Hough was born in Bozrah, Connecticut, October 26, 1803, and worked in early life upon his father's farm. His skill in nursing a sick brother led Dr. Samuel Johnson, of Bozrah, to assist him in the study of medicine. He attended lectures at the Berkshire Medical College, in Pittsfield, Mass, as well as at Yale Medical School, where he graduated in 1832.  On receiving his diploma he settled in Essex, then a parish in Saybrook, Conn., where he continued until his death, on August 18, 1886, in his 83rd year. He was a member of the Baptist Church in Essex, and a deacon therein from 1840 until his death. He was elected to the Connecticut State Senate in 1855 His first wife, Mary Lathrop, died in 1833, leaving no children.  His second wife, Susan E. Williams, of Essex, died November 15, 1872, leaving seven children

References

External links
 

1803 births
1886 deaths
Yale School of Medicine alumni
Berkshire Medical College alumni
Physicians from Connecticut
Connecticut state senators
19th-century American politicians